The Survivalist is a 2015 British post-apocalyptic science fiction thriller film written and directed by Stephen Fingleton and starring Martin McCann, Mia Goth, and Olwen Fouéré.

Plot

The film takes place following a severe drop in the global population. The Survivalist is first seen burying the body of a near-naked man, and then resetting a bear trap. He is then shown to be living efficiently in the wild in a small cabin; he harvests vegetable crops for food, forages berries, washes clothes in a nearby stream, fertilizes seeds, and lays traps against intruders around his small farm's perimeter.

One day, the Survivalist hears noise outside his cabin, and rushes out to find an old woman and a younger woman standing outside his door. The old woman introduces herself as Kathryn, and the younger woman as her daughter, Milja. Kathryn offers the Survivalist some jewellery and seeds in exchange for some of his crops, but he declines, all the while holding them at gunpoint. Finally, Kathryn offers him Milja, and an agreement is made for sex with the young woman in exchange for food. The Survivalist locks Kathryn in a back room while he and Milja have sex.

The following morning, the Survivalist tells the women to take their belongings and leave. Kathryn steps outside and Milja is about to join her, when suddenly she returns inside and takes a razor and some soap. Milja caresses his face, before softly shaving him.

Kathryn and Milja have been allowed to stay. Over the following days, they fall into an uneasy domestic routine alongside the Survivalist; they farm during the day, eat dinner together in the evening, and then Milja and the Survivalist have sex every night. However, Kathryn and Milja plan to secretly kill the Survivalist in order to reduce the amount of supplies being used. One night, on Kathryn's orders, Milja steals the two last shells from the Survivalist's shotgun. The next morning, before their plan can be put into action, Milja is abducted by a drifter while bathing in the stream. After the Survivalist is alerted by an out-of-place footprint in the mud outside the cabin, he takes off into the woods after Milja and her assailant. After tracking them down, the Survivalist tries to load his shotgun but realises that his shells are missing. As a result, the assailant is able to shoot the Survivalist in the stomach. The assailant approaches the wounded Survivalist, first intending to shoot him again in order to kill him, but pulls out his knife instead, presumably to save the bullet. The Survivalist stops the drifter’s knife and pulls out his own knife at the last second and slits the assailant's throat. Back at the cabin, Milja and Kathryn treat the Survivalist's wound, prying the bullet out and cauterising the wound. When the wound becomes infected, Kathryn wants to let him die, but Milja convinces Kathryn to help nurse him back to health.

One night, after the Survivalist has returned to full health, a band of raiders arrive at the cabin. The Survivalist gathers Milja and Kathryn, and informs them that he counted six raiders. Armed with only a shotgun with two shells and a pistol with one bullet salvaged from Milja's abductor, they decide that they are outnumbered and cannot fight back. They have no choice but to keep quiet while the raiders attempt, but fail, to break into the cabin. The following morning, the Survivalist, Kathryn and Milja emerge from the cabin to discover that their farm has been ransacked and all of their crops have been stolen. In the following days, they work to save the farm, but they begin to slowly starve. Meanwhile, Milja discovers she is pregnant and attempts to perform an abortion on herself with a length of wire, but stops at the last moment. Kathryn again floats the idea of killing the Survivalist, explaining that there is only enough food for two people. Milja agrees that there is only enough food for two people, and suggests poisoning the Survivalist. That night, Milja makes a meal with poison mushrooms.

The following morning, Kathryn tells the Survivalist that she and Milja are leaving. Milja tells her she wants to stay; Kathryn immediately goes to the sink and vomits, realising that Milja has poisoned her instead of poisoning the Survivalist. Resigned to her death, Kathryn tells the Survivalist to cut her wrists and bury her after she dies, which he does. On the way back from burying Kathryn, the Survivalist finds two rabbits caught in some of his traps, which would have been enough food for three people had Kathryn survived. The Survivalist returns to the cabin, and tells Milja about his brother while preparing the rabbits to eat. He tells her that they used to steal supplies from camps by going in and out undetected. During one run, his brother saw a girl and couldn't help himself.  While attempting to rape her, she screamed and a chase ensued. Realising that there was no way that both of them would escape alive, the Survivalist cut his brother's Achilles tendon and left him to die. The Survivalist tells her that he did what he had to do to survive; in telling her this, he reassures her that she did the right thing in poisoning Kathryn. Shortly thereafter, Milja wordlessly informs the Survivalist that she is pregnant by placing his hand on her belly.

The Survivalist and Milja are out foraging one day when they notice that the raiders have returned. The Survivalist decides that they need to leave the farm, but before they can, they need to collect their storage of crop seeds. Milja sneaks into their green house for the seeds and the Survivalist stands watch while the raiders ransack the cabin. Milja successfully grabs the seeds; on her way out, she grabs a machete, which makes a noise and alerts the raiders to her presence. Milja and the Survivalist run into the woods, but the raiders give chase. After the raiders surround them, the Survivalist sees a vision of his brother. He tells Milja that his brother's name was Augustus, before instructing her to run while he distracts the raiders. The Survivalist begins playing the harmonica, drawing the raiders towards him and away from Milja. One of the raiders stumbles onto Milja's location, but she lures him into a bear trap and makes her escape. The Survivalist manages to shoot and kill one of the raiders, but he is eventually shot with a crossbow bolt. His dying body is looted next to a large spit and fire made from the cabin's wood, implying that the raiders are cannibalistic.

Milja wanders the woods alone for a long time, until she eventually arrives at a large compound, surrounded by barbed-wire fences and patrolled by armed guards. She walks up to the gate and hands her bag and her machete over to the guard on the other side. The guard runs off into the compound. Confused, Milja turns to a female guard and asks her what happens next. The guard tells Milja that a vote will be held to decide whether or not to let Milja stay. The guard then realises that Milja is pregnant and asks if she knows what she will call the baby. Milja answers, "If it's a boy…"

Cast
 Martin McCann as The Survivalist
 Mia Goth as Milja
 Olwen Fouéré as Kathryn
 Andrew Simpson as The Gaunt Man
 Douglas Russell as The Snatcher
 Kieri Kennedy as The Woman In The Photograph

Production
The Survivalist was filmed in Northern Ireland. The film was expanded from Stephen Fingleton's 2014 short film Magpie, also starring Martin McCann and Mia Goth but with Olivia Williams in the role similar to Olwen Fouéré's.

The post-apocalyptic thriller was released in UK cinemas and on demand on 12 February 2016 and in the United States by IFC Midnight on 19 May 2017 in limited release.

Release

Critical reception

The Survivalist received positive reviews from critics. On Rotten Tomatoes, the film has a 97% score based on 39 reviews, with an average rating of 7.8/10. The critical consensus states: "The Survivalist's deliberate pace pays gripping dividends with a tautly told post-apocalyptic drama that offers some uniquely thought-provoking twists." On Metacritic, the film has a weighted average score of 80 out of 100, based on 10 critics, indicating "generally favorable reviews".

Accolades

References

External links
 
 
 

2015 films
2010s science fiction thriller films
2015 independent films
British independent films
British science fiction thriller films
British post-apocalyptic films
British survival films
2010s survival films
2010s English-language films
2010s British films